Evandro Carlos Escardalete (born 12 February 1974), known simply as Evandro, is a Brazilian retired footballer who played mainly as a forward.

Club career
After playing with modest teams in his native country (Esporte Clube Taubaté, Londrina Esporte Clube, Criciúma Esporte Clube, Mirassol Futebol Clube, União Bandeirante FC and ABC Futebol Clube), São Paulo-born Evandro moved in 2000 to Portugal, joining Rio Ave F.C. in the second division. He became an instant first choice, going on to amass more than 300 overall appearances for the Vila do Conde club.

In the 2003–04 season, as Rio Ave had just been promoted to the Primeira Liga, Evandro scored 15 goals in 26 games, notably two in a 4–0 home rout of Sporting CP and another in a 1–1 home draw against S.L. Benfica, helping the side finish in seventh place. From 2008 to 2010, he appeared in a combined 33 league matches – only six in the latter top level campaign – and did not manage to find the net. 

After a decade with same team, and a brief spell in his homeland with amateurs Clube Atlético Guaçuano, Evandro retired from football at the age of 36.

References

External links

1974 births
Living people
Footballers from São Paulo
Brazilian footballers
Association football forwards
Esporte Clube Taubaté players
Londrina Esporte Clube players
Criciúma Esporte Clube players
Mirassol Futebol Clube players
União Bandeirante Futebol Clube players
ABC Futebol Clube players
Primeira Liga players
Liga Portugal 2 players
Rio Ave F.C. players
Brazilian expatriate footballers
Expatriate footballers in Portugal
Brazilian expatriate sportspeople in Portugal